Decline and Fall is a novel by the English author Evelyn Waugh, first published in 1928.

Decline and Fall may also refer to:
 Decline and Fall... of a Birdwatcher, a 1968 British film based on Waugh's novel
 Decline and Fall (TV series), 2017 BBC TV adaption of the novel with Jack Whitehall
 Decline and Fall of the Roman Empire (game), a 1972 board game
 "Peggy Hill: The Decline and Fall (Part 2)", an episode of the television series King of the Hill
 The History of the Decline and Fall of the Roman Empire by Edward Gibbon, a major literary achievement of the 18th century
 Decline & Fall (EP), a 2014 EP by English industrial metal band Godflesh
 Decline and Fall: Europe's Slow Motion Suicide, a 2008 book by Bruce Thornton

See also